Adam Hugh is the number one table tennis player under sixteen in the United States and is most noted for his victory in the 2003 North American Cadet Championship, as well as the US National Cadet Championship.

Other career accomplishments include finishing third in singles, doubles and team at the ITTF Junior Circuit Tournament in Canada. He finished 11 at the World Cadet Challenge. In the team event, North America lost in the semi-final to Asia 2-3, and Hugh took two points: one over World Cadet finalist and Asian Cadet Champion Jun Mizutani from Japan and the number one cadet from Hong Kong, Li, Kwun Ngai.  Hugh finished seventh at the 2003 US Men's Team Trials in Atlanta, missing the US Team basically by one game. If he had beaten De Tran instead of losing 4-3, he would have been the number 4 player who was sent to the world's in Paris. At this event Hugh beat Eric Owens, Brian Pace, David Wang, and Ashu Jain.

In recent years he has beaten:
 Li Yu Xiang three times
 Shao Yu twice
 David Fernández
 Sean Lonergan twice
 Barney Reed twice

Results and accomplishments
2006 NCTTA "Rookie of the Year" (5/2006)
2006 US Men's National Team member (12/2005)
2006 US National Junior Boys' Team member (12/2005)
2006 USA Collegiate Men's Team member (12/2005)
2006 USA Collegiate Men's Champion (12/2005)
2005 USATT Male Athlete of the Year (1/2006)
2005 US National Mixed Doubles Champion (12/2005)
2005 US National Junior Boys' Champion (12/2005)
2005 US National Junior Boys' Team member (12/2004)
2005 US National Collegiate Champion (12/2005)
2005 US National Collegiate Team member (12/2004)
2005 US Under 22 Men's Singles finalist (12/2005)
2005 US Men's Singles semi-finalist (12/2005)
2005 US Men's Doubles semi-finalist (12/2005)
2005 ITTF Pro Tour/ Open Under 30 Men's Singles finalist (7/2005)
2005 ITTF Pro Tour/US Open 18 and Under Boys' Singles finalist (7/2005)

Personal
Hugh is the son of table tennis player and coach Lily Yip.

References

Year of birth missing (living people)
Living people
American male table tennis players